This is a list of cadet colleges in Pakistan. They are military schools which prepare students for the armed forces.

Cadet colleges
Kings Cadet College Gujrat
Bakhtawar Cadet College For Girls Shaheed Benazirabad
Cadet College (Girls) Mardan
Cadet College (Girls) Turbat
Cadet College Choa Saiden Shah
Cadet College Faisalabad
Cadet College Fateh Jang
Cadet College Fort munro
Cadet College Gadap Karachi
Cadet College Ghotki
Cadet College Hasan Abdal
Cadet College Jaffarabad
Cadet College Jhelum
Cadet College Kallar Kahar
Cadet College Khushab
Cadet College Killa Saifullah
Cadet College Kohat
Cadet College Larkana
Cadet College Mastung
Cadet College Ormara
Cadet College Pak Steel, Bin Qasim
Cadet College Palandri
Cadet College Pano Aqil
Cadet College Pasrur
Cadet College Petaro
Cadet College Rawalpindi
Cadet College Razmak
Cadet College Sanghar
Cadet College Sargodha
Cadet College Skardu
Cadet College Spinkai
Cadet College Wana
Cadet College Warsak
Frontier Scouts Cadet College Warsak
Garrison Cadet College Kohat
Karnal Sher Khan Cadet College Sawabi
Manjaanbazam Cadet College
Rangers Cadet College Chakri
Shaheed Benazir Bhutto Cadet College (Girls) Larkana
WAPDA Cadet College Tarbela
Cadet College (Girls) Turbat

Military colleges 
 Military College Jhelum
 Military College Sui
 Military College Murree

PAF colleges
 PAF College Lower Topa
 PAF College Sargodha

See also
 List of cadet colleges in Bangladesh
 Dholpur Military School
 Sainik School
 National Cadet Corps (Pakistan)

References

 
 Pakistan education-related lists